is a very small asteroid, classified as near-Earth object of the Apollo group, that passed between Earth and the Moon on 8 September 2010, at 21:12 UTC, approaching Earth within  above Antarctica. Based on a short 7-day observation arc from that apparation, it was listed for 12 years on the Sentry Risk Table as the asteroid with the greatest known probability (5%) of impacting Earth.  was recovered in August 2022, and now has a 12 year observation arc and a much better known orbit. As of the December 2022 solution which accounts for nongravitational forces, there is a 1-in-10 chance of an Earth impact on 5 September 2095.

Description 
NASA's Near Earth Program estimates its size to be  in diameter with a mass of around 500 tonnes.  will make many more close approaches to Earth. Around 6 September 2095 it will pass  from Earth. When an asteroid roughly 7-meters in diameter does impact Earth, there is very little danger of harm arising from such an impact; rather there is expected to be an impressive fireball (estimated in the Risk table as nearly 9 KT of energy release) as the rock air bursts in the upper atmosphere and pebble sized fragments would likely fall to the ground at terminal velocity. The power of the airburst would be somewhere between the 2–4 m Sutter's Mill meteorite and the 17 m Chelyabinsk meteor (which was 440 KT equivalent energy). The approach of 2096 is poorly known because it is dependent on the Earth approach/perturbations in September 2095.

On 17 February 2059 the asteroid will pass 3.5 million km from Earth and reach about apparent magnitude 22.6 by late February. On 10 September 1915 it passed  from Earth.

See also 
 , a similar-sized asteroid that passed Earth the same day
 , another near-Earth asteroid (may be Saturn V stage IV rocket booster)
 
 Asteroid impact prediction
 List of asteroid close approaches to Earth, for other close approaches
 Earth-grazing fireball
 Meteoroid

Notes

References

External links 
 Risk corridor over Southern Hemisphere
 2010 RF12: A second asteroid will buzz the Earth today, csmonitor.com, September 8, 2010
 Early warning for close approaches of two house-sized asteroids, The Planetary Society, September 8, 2010
 
 
 

Minor planet object articles (unnumbered)
Potential impact events caused by near-Earth objects
20100908
20100905